Regina pocket watches were a brand of pocket watches made by Omega that were popular in the early 1900s.  The name Regina Pocket Watch was originally trademarked by LOUIS MAIER in Bienne Switzerland in 1888.  The name was then trademarked by Omega in 1911, indicating that they bought the company at that time.  The faces and mechanisms were imported into New York and assembled with cases in Ontario, for sale mostly in Canada.

Individually stamped production runs were made for a small fee.  The result is that many Regina watches have the name and town of a vendor on their face.  One watch has been traced to the Arcola Jewelry store in Arcola Saskatchewan. Regina watches are occasionally stamped with the name of an American city, indicating that some were sold in the United States.

The National Association of Watch and Clock Collectors describes Regina watches as an inferior brand of Omega, but mentions that some were adjusted highly enough to be used as railroad timepieces, which was the standard for quality watches.  The use of Regina watches for railroad timekeeping is documented on other sites as well.  For example: "Some of these Regina-signed watches were Adjusted Highly Enough as to be suitable for use in railroad time service."

The term 'farmer watch' is sometimes applied to them.  This may be because of their robust quality, the fact that they were sold in rural stores or that Canada had a largely rural population.

Some early watches, made before the Omega takeover have a date stamped on the mechanism.  The company changed hands in the 1970s and the new owners destroyed many of the old records, making it difficult to precisely date most Regina watches. The records that still exist make it possible to roughly date them by their serial numbers.  This list comes from an Omega memo:

From: Departement: Controle Central de Fabrication
Bienne la 16 Fevrier 1970
Concerne Annees de fabrication  

1,000,000 = 1907-1910-1912
2,000,000 = 1904 - 1916
3,000,000 = 1906 - 1919
4,000,000 = 1910 - 1919
5,000,000 = 1916 - 1927
6,000,000 = 1923 - 1927
7,000,000 = 1920 - 1935

It seems that large batches of certain numbered watches were made and sold over a period of years.

Sizes

The systems used for sizing pocket watches have changed over time.  In North America, pocket watches are usually sized by the Lancashire gauge which is based on the Size 0s being 1 inch across and increasing sizes being measured in 1/30th of an inch.  The measurement is according to the width of the plate under the face, not the exterior of the case.  For any important purpose the size should be determined correctly.  These references contain detailed information about sizes.

For home collectors, a close estimate can be made by measuring the actual face. 
These are common Regina watch sizes and approximate face diameters in millimeters.

18s Common          44.9 mm

16s Common          43.2 mm

13s Common          40.64 mm

12s Common          39.8 mm

What does adjusted mean?

Quality watches were checked in different positions (dial facing up, down, sideways, etc.) More adjustments generally meant better quality.

References

Watch manufacturing companies